Fort Collins Weekly was a weekly community newspaper serving the city of Fort Collins, Colorado. It had a circulation of 33,700, making it the largest weekly newspaper in northern Colorado. It was purchased by Swift Communications in July 2007, and renamed Fort Collins Now. Swift Communications ceased publication of the paper in May 2009.

History
Fort Collins Weekly published its first issue on March 5, 2003. It was founded by publisher Joel Dyer and editor-in-chief Greg Campbell and operated for its first year from a small office on Oak Street in Old Town Fort Collins. The initial print run was 20,000 papers distributed free in newspaper boxes and wire racks throughout the city. Circulation grew along with its staff and in September 2004, the Weekly relocated to offices in the historic Miller Block Building at 11 Old Town Square. In December 2007, 33,700 copies of the paper were printed, with 28,200 mailed directly to city residents and the remaining 5,500 distributed on the street.

As a community newspaper, the Weekly covered all aspects of life in Fort Collins, from local government and local business to major crimes and in-depth investigations. The Weekly won major awards for its journalism from the Society of Professional Journalists. Its "Culture" section covered everything from theater and music to food and nightlife.

Staff
Greg Campbell was the editor-in-chief. He is the author of three books, The Road to Kosovo: A Balkan Diary, Blood Diamonds: Tracing the Deadly Path of the World's Most Precious Stones, and FLAWLESS: Inside the Largest Diamond Heist in History.

Andra Coberly was the managing editor. She is a Fort Collins native and graduate of the California Polytechnic State University at San Luis Obispo. She won a first place award from the Society of Professional Journalists for her coverage of methamphetamine use in Fort Collins.

Regular freelance writers included Kurt Brighton, who covered arts and entertainment; Thomas Delapa, film critic and film curator of the Denver Art Museum; columnist Andrew Boucher, who covered local politics from a conservative angle; historian Barbara Fleming; reporter Connie Pfeiffenberger, the former co-owner of Fort Collins' Triangle Review; travel writer Lisa Parker; Susan Schaibly, arts reporter and book reviewer, and Mike Nelson, meteorologist for KMGH-TV Channel 7. Syndicated content included poetry edited by former U.S. Poet Laureate Ted Kooser, astrology by Rob Brezsny and the Newsday crossword puzzle.

Fort Collins Weekly was headed by two brothers; publisher Joel Dyer and associate publisher the psychologist. Joel Dyer has authored two books for Westview Press: Harvest of Rage and The Perpetual Prisoner Machine. Dr. Paul Dyer has also authored two books: The Ultimate Job Search Survival Guide for Peterson's and Sacred Path, Joyful Journey. Sherri Hageman was the art director. Brooke Hupp was director of accounting. Raymond Amos, Rob Seligmann, Lauren Fuller and Laura Diane Moore were advertising sales representatives. David Hutton was classified sales manager and circulation manager.

References

External links
 Fort Collins Weekly

Defunct newspapers published in Colorado
Mass media in Fort Collins, Colorado